Quebecs is a Grade II listed 4-star hotel with 44 rooms located on Quebec Street in Leeds, West Yorkshire, England. Built in 1891, the building has two-storey-high stained glass windows which display the coats of arms of the principal towns of Yorkshire.  Previously the building was used as the headquarters of the Leeds & County Liberal Club. The building underwent a £6 million renovation when it was acquired by The Eton Collection in 2000.

Awards
The hotel has been awarded Tablet Hotels Selection Award 2009, Esquire Best UK Business Hotel 2007, one of The Independent's 50 best British hotels 2007 and One of the top hotels in the world by Condé Nast Traveler 2003.

See also
Listed buildings in Leeds (City and Hunslet Ward - northern area)

References

External links
 Official website

Hotels in Leeds
Grade II listed buildings in Leeds
Grade II listed hotels